The 1906 European Figure Skating Championships were held on January 28 and 29 in Davos, Switzerland. Elite figure skaters competed for the title of European Champion in the category of men's singles.

Results

Men

Judges:
 Hugo Winzer 
 P. Birum 
 Edgar Syers 
 Gustav Hügel 
 Tibor von Földváry

References

Sources
 Result List provided by the ISU

European Figure Skating Championships, 1906
European Figure Skating Championships
1906 in Swiss sport
Sport in Davos
International figure skating competitions hosted by Switzerland
January 1906 sports events